smartTrade Technologies is a multi-national financial software company that provides technology for financial institutions. Harry Gozlan and David Vincent, Chairman of the board and CEO of the company, created smartTrade in 1999. Since then, smartTrade has developed software for:
Internalization/matching for equities, fixed income, FX
 FX eCommerce and single dealer platform
OTC and derivatives dealing systems
Commodities dealing (including precious metals)
 Smart Order Routing in all asset classes.

The company has its headquarters in Aix-en-Provence France,  with subsidiaries in London, Geneva, Milan, Istanbul, New York City, Singapore, Toronto and Tokyo.

Products 
LiquidityCrosser
LiquidityOrchestrator
LiquidityDistributor
LiquidityAggregator
LiquidityConnect
LiquidityFX
smartFI
smartAnalytics
Crypto's

References

External links

Financial software companies
Financial services companies of France
French companies established in 1999